This is a list of tornadoes that have been rated officially or unofficially on the International Fujita scale (IF-scale). The International Fujita scale was drafted in 2018 by the European Severe Storms Laboratory (ESSL) along with multiple European meteorological agencies. As of 2023, the scale is not officially published for use, however, various tornadoes have received official/unofficial ratings under the scale. Since the scale is not officially in use, official ratings can only come from published academic papers or analyses from a government meteorological agency or from the European Severe Storms Laboratory and their partners.

List 
At least 40 tornadoes have received an official or unofficial rating on the International Fujita scale, with official ones in the Czech Republic, Denmark, Italy, Russia, Greece, Germany, Turkey, Poland, Norway, Sweden, Netherlands, Cyprus, Spain, Slovak Republic, and in France, and two unofficial ones in the United States.

See also 
 Tornado
 Tornadoes by year
 Tornado records
 Tornado climatology
 Tornado myths
 Tornado intensity
 Fujita scale
 Enhanced Fujita scale
 International Fujita scale
 TORRO scale

References 

Tornado-related lists